Combretum aculeatum is a species of flowering plant in the bushwillow genus Combretum, family Combretaceae. It is native to the Sahelian and Sudanian savannas and adjacent forest–savanna mosaic in Africa and Saudi Arabia, and has been introduced to Myanmar. High in protein, it is greatly relished as a browse by wild and domesticated mammalian herbivores, except elephants.

References

aculeatum
Flora of West Tropical Africa
Flora of Cameroon
Flora of the Central African Republic
Flora of the Democratic Republic of the Congo
Flora of Northeast Tropical Africa
Flora of East Tropical Africa
Flora of Saudi Arabia
Plants described in 1808